Karl M. Guðmundsson (January 28, 1924 – June 24, 2012) was an Icelandic football manager and former player. He managed the Icelandic national team from 1954 to 1956. He also coached Lillestrøm SK, KR, Fram.

References

External links

1924 births
2012 deaths
Karl Gudmundsson
Karl Gudmundsson
Karl Gudmundsson
Karl Gudmundsson
Karl Gudmundsson
Karl Gudmundsson
Karl Gudmundsson
Karl Gudmundsson
Lillestrøm SK managers
Association footballers not categorized by position
Icelandic expatriate football managers
Icelandic expatriate sportspeople in Norway
Expatriate football managers in Norway